Cold Sweat Plays J. B. is an album by trombonist Craig Harris' tribute band Cold Sweat performing compositions by James Brown which was recorded in 1988 and released on the JMT label.

Reception
The AllMusic review by Ron Wynn called it "As fine an example of applying improvisational élan to R&B/soul idiom as you can find in the 80s".

Track listing
All compositions by James Brown except as indicated
 "Brown's Prance" (Craig Harris) - 0:52   
 "Give It Up or Turnit a Loose" (Charles Bobbit) - 6:52   
 "It's a Man's Man's Man's World" (Brown, Betty Jean Newsome) - 6:51   
 "I Got the Feelin'" - 0:17   
 "Brown's Dance" (Harris) - 3:45   
 "Showtime Medley:" - (6:26)
 "Funky Good Time - 1:45
 "I Got the Feelin'" - 0:17
 "I Can't Stand It" - 0:56
 "Licking Stick" (Brown, Bobby Byrd, Alfred Ellis) - 0:40
 "There Was a Time" (Brown, Buddy Hopgood) - 6:26   
 "Please, Please, Please" (Brown, Johnny Terry) - 4:38   
 "Try Me" - 3:41   
 "Cold Sweat" (Brown, Ellis) - 7:25

Personnel
Craig Harris - trombone, vocals, music director
Eddie Allen - trumpet
Kenny Rogers - alto saxophone, soprano saxophone
Booker T. Williams - tenor saxophone
Brandon Ross, Fred Wells - electric guitar
Clyde Criner - keyboards
Alonzo Gardner - electric bass
Damon Mendez - drums
Kweyao Agyapon - percussion

Guests:
Olu Dara - trumpet (tracks 2 & 7)
Arthur Blythe - alto saxophone (tracks 2 & 3)
David Murray - tenor saxophone (tracks 5 & 9)
 Kenyatte Abdur-Rahman - percussion (track 6) 
Sekou Sundiata - vocals (tracks 2 & 6)

References 

1989 albums
Craig Harris albums
JMT Records albums
Winter & Winter Records albums